The Morgan–Monroe Observatory, also known as the Morgan–Monroe Station of Goethe Link Observatory, is an astronomical observatory owned and operated by Indiana University. It was developed in the 1960s when light pollution began to degrade the capabilities of the original Goethe Link Observatory, which Indiana University had used for astronomical research since 1948. The original Boller and Chivens  Cassegrain reflector, installed in 1966, was converted in 1989 to an automated system for monitoring cataclysmic variable stars called "Roboscope." It is capable of making one or two 4-minute exposures of about 100 objects per clear night. In 1997, an automated 1.25 m f/8 Ritchey–Chrétien reflector called "Spectrabot" was added.

See also
 List of astronomical observatories

Notes and references

External links
 Department of Astronomy at Indiana University Bloomington

Astronomical observatories in Indiana
Indiana University
Buildings and structures in Monroe County, Indiana